was the son of Atagi Fuyuyasu. He was a Japanese samurai of the Sengoku period.

References

Samurai
1549 births
1578 deaths
Miyoshi clan